Last One Picked is the second studio album by the Christian rock band Superchic[k]. The song, "Hero", appeared in the film, To Save a Life. "Na Na" appeared on the Disney film, Confessions of a Teenage Drama Queen.

Track listing 
Credits adapted from CD booklet.

Notes
"We All Fall" ends at 1:54, followed by silence. At 6:54, a hidden untitled track plays.

References

Superchick albums
2002 albums
Inpop Records albums